Milwaukie eSchool is a public high school in Milwaukie, Oregon, United States. It is located on the campus of the Milwaukie High School.

Academics
In 2008, 4% of the school's seniors received a high school diploma. Of 46 students, two graduated, 28 dropped out, and 16 were still in high school  the following year.

In 2009, seven seniors graduated from Milwaukie eSchool, according to the Oregon Department of Education.

References

High schools in Clackamas County, Oregon
Milwaukie, Oregon
Public high schools in Oregon